This is a list of the mammal species recorded in French Polynesia. There are twelve mammal species in French Polynesia, of which two are endangered and one is vulnerable.

The following tags are used to highlight each species' conservation status as assessed by the International Union for Conservation of Nature:

Some species were assessed using an earlier set of criteria. Species assessed using this system have the following instead of near threatened and least concern categories:

Order: Cetacea (whales) 

The order Cetacea includes whales, dolphins and porpoises. They are the mammals most fully adapted to aquatic life with a spindle-shaped nearly hairless body, protected by a thick layer of blubber, and forelimbs and tail modified to provide propulsion underwater.

Suborder: Mysticeti
Family: Balaenopteridae
Subfamily: Balaenopterinae
Genus: Balaenoptera
 Minke whale, Balaenoptera acutorostrata LR/nt
 Bryde's whale, Balaenoptera edeni DD
 Blue whale, Balaenoptera musculus EN
 Fin whale, Balaenoptera physalus EN
 Humpback whale, Megaptera novaeangliae
Suborder: Odontoceti
Superfamily: Platanistoidea
Family: Physeteridae
Genus: Physeter
 Sperm whale, Physeter macrocephalus VU
Family: Kogiidae
Genus: Kogia
 Dwarf sperm whale, Kogia sima LR/lc
Family: Ziphidae
Subfamily: Hyperoodontinae
Genus: Mesoplodon
 Ginkgo-toothed beaked whale, Mesoplodon ginkgodens DD
Family: Delphinidae (marine dolphins)
Genus: Steno
 Rough-toothed dolphin, Steno bredanensis DD
Genus: Stenella
 Spinner dolphin, Stenella longirostris LR/cd
Genus: Lagenodelphis
 Fraser's dolphin, Lagenodelphis hosei DD
Genus: Peponocephala
 Melon-headed whale, Peponocephala electra LR/lc
Genus: Feresa
 Pygmy killer whale, Feresa attenuata DD

See also
List of chordate orders
Lists of mammals by region
List of prehistoric mammals
Mammal classification
List of mammals described in the 2000s

Notes

References

French Polynesia
.
French Polynesia
French Polynesia-related lists
Lists of biota of French Polynesia